Gábor Vaszary or Gábor von Vaszary, (7 June 1897 in Budapest – 22 May 1985), was a Hungarian novelist and screenwriter. He emigrated to Switzerland in 1947. He wrote a number of novels which depict life in Paris in the 1950s.

Several of his books have been adapted for cinema, for example Monpti which was the basis for the 1957 film Love from Paris directed by Helmut Käutner.

Selected filmography 
Life Begins at Seventeen (1953)
She (1954)
Love from Paris (1957)
Marry Me, Cherie (1964)

References

External links

1897 births
1985 deaths
20th-century Hungarian novelists
Hungarian-language writers
Writers from Budapest
20th-century Hungarian male writers
Hungarian male novelists
20th-century Hungarian screenwriters